George Robert Cox (9 November 1859 – 24 February 1936) was an English cricketer who made one appearance in first-class cricket in 1884. He was a right-handed batsman.

Cox made what would be his only appearance in first-class cricket in 1884 when he was selected for the Liverpool and District cricket team against the touring Australians at Aigburth. In a match which the Australians won by 1 wicket, Cox was dismissed for ducks in both Liverpool and District innings, bowled by George Giffen and Joey Palmer in each innings respectively.

He died at Hoylake, Cheshire on 24 February 1936. His brother Alexander Cox was also a first-class cricketer.

References

External links
George Cox at ESPNcricinfo
George Cox at CricketArchive

`

1859 births
1936 deaths
Sportspeople from Twickenham
People educated at Uppingham School
English cricketers
Liverpool and District cricketers